Ouled Si Ahmed is a town and commune in Setif Province in north-eastern Algeria.

The city has the Berber douar khoms and gasmi bousswalim dwibi and other family name

References

Communes of Sétif Province
Cities in Algeria
Algeria